Bob Tiernan is an American politician and attorney who served in the Oregon House of Representatives, representing Oregon's 24th district, which included most of Lake Oswego and portions of southwestern Portland. He is a Republican, and served as chair of the state party from 2009 to 2011.

Education
He earned a Bachelor of Science degree from Oregon State University, a Juris Doctor degree from the University of Puget Sound, and a Master of Laws degree from Georgetown University.

Career
In 1992, he was elected to the Oregon House and served 2 two-year terms. In 1996, he lost to his 1994 opponent, Richard Devlin. In 2002, he ran for the Oregon State Senate to represent the 19th senate district, again facing Devlin, narrowly losing by a margin of 47% to 50%.

He served as chief petitioners on several successful statewide ballot measures, including Measure 11 (mandatory minimum sentences), Measure 8 (pension reform), and Measure 17 (prison labor), all in 1994.

In January 2009, he was elected as chair of the Oregon Republican Party and served until 2011, when he was succeeded by Allen Alley.

Tiernan ran for Governor of Oregon in the 2022 election but lost the Republican primary to Christine Drazan.

Personal life
Tiernan and his wife Susan live in Lake Oswego. They have three children.

References

External links

Georgetown University Law Center alumni
Living people
Members of the Oregon House of Representatives
Oregon Republican Party chairs
Oregon State University alumni
Politicians from Lake Oswego, Oregon
University of Puget Sound alumni
Year of birth missing (living people)